The 1959 Brownlow Medal was the 32nd year the award was presented to the player adjudged the fairest and best player during the Victorian Football League (VFL) home and away season. Bob Skilton of the South Melbourne Football Club and Verdun Howell of the St Kilda Football Club both won the medal by polling twenty votes during the 1959 VFL season.

Under the tie-breaker rules in place in 1959, Skilton was originally the outright winner: he and Howell were tied on 20 votes, but Skilton polled five 3-vote games to Howell's three. In 1980, the League removed the tie-break from the rules and allowed for multiple tied winners in the same year; and in 1989 it retrospectively removed the tie-breaker from all previous counts, elevating Howell to joint winner of the 1959 medal.

Leading votegetters 
* The player was ineligible to win the medal due to suspension by the VFL Tribunal during the year.

References 

1959 in Australian rules football
1959